The Outs is a web series which premiered on Vimeo in 2012. Filmed and set in Brooklyn, New York, the show tells the story of Mitchell (played by Adam Goldman), his best friend Oona (Sasha Winters), and his ex-boyfriend Jack (Hunter Canning). It debuted in March 2012 with a run of six episodes, with a "Chanukah Special" in April 2013. A second season of six episodes began in March 2016, followed by a special December 2016 episode.

Plot
Following their breakup, Mitchell and Jack navigate gay life in New York.

Cast
 Adam Goldman as Mitchell Webb
 Sasha Winters as Oona Halpern, Mitchell's best friend
 Hunter Canning as Jack Widdows, Mitchell's ex-boyfriend
 Tommy Heleringer as Paul "Scruffy", Jack's newest love interest
 Phillip Taratula as Ty, Mitchell's sassy friend and former coworker
 Alan Cumming as Himself
 Owen Scott as Frank, Jack's straight stoner friend
 Shawn Frank as Russell, a guy Oona dates (season 1)
 Sean Patrick McGowan as Drew, Oona's ex-boyfriend who slept with Jack (season 1)
 Jon Golbe as Cute Delivery Guy (season 1)
 William DeMeritt as Kevin, Oona's publisher and lover (season 2)
 Mark Junek as Rob, Mitchell's chef boyfriend (season 2)
 Becky Yamamoto as Leila, Mitchell's coworker (season 2)
 Joel Perez as Eli, a guy with whom Jack has regular casual sex (season 2)
 Cecil Baldwin as Braden, Mitchell's roommate (season 2)
 Patricia Buckley as Leah, Oona's editor (season 2)
 Bowen Yang as Jason, Leah's assistant (season 2)
 Michael Cyril Creighton as Gordy, Mitchell's gay coworker/nemesis (season 2)
 Dan Savage as Himself (season 2)

Episodes

Season 1

Season 2

Production and release
The first season of The Outs was crowdfunded through two Kickstarter campaigns. Started after the first episode was complete, the first campaign had a goal of $1000 and received $1685. The second campaign, started after the first three episodes were released, had a goal of $8000 and achieved $22,339 with 503 backers. With the goal exceeded, producers produced a promised special seventh episode, later called the "Chanukah Special".

Set in Brooklyn, New York, the series was filmed predominantly in the Prospect Heights and Crown Heights areas of Brooklyn.

The first season of six episodes premiered via Vimeo on March 27, 2012. The Chanukah Special was released on April 1, 2013.

A second season of six episodes, funded by Vimeo, premiered on Vimeo On Demand on March 30, 2016. A special seventh episode titled "Cookie-wise" was released on December 24, 2016, available for streaming at no charge.

The full two seasons are available to stream free on the series' website.

Awards and nominations

References

External links

 
 
 

2012 web series debuts
American drama web series
Kickstarter-funded web series
LGBT-related mass media in the United States
American LGBT-related web series